Jinzhu is a town which is the county seat of Daocheng County, in the Garzê Tibetan Autonomous Prefecture of Sichuan, China.

Populated places in the Garzê Tibetan Autonomous Prefecture

Towns in Sichuan